Harold Dewolf Paddock Jr. (December 17, 1920 in Cleveland, Ohio – February 27, 2000 in Palm Beach Gardens, Florida) was a well-known amateur golfer in the northeast Ohio area, having won the Ohio Amateur Championship in 1948 and 1950, and was a member of the 1951 Walker Cup team. Paddock turned pro shortly thereafter and played professionally. Paddock lived in Aurora, Ohio from 1955 until he relocated permanently to Florida after the death of his wife, Margie (née Stoneman). The Paddock family owned and operated the Aurora Country Club and the Moreland Hills Country Club (both now closed), in the suburban Cleveland area.

Paddock was inducted into the Northern Ohio Golf Hall of Fame, along with his father, golf course architect Harold Dewolf Paddock Sr. (1888–1969) in 2006, both being recognized for their many achievements and contributions to the game of golf in northern Ohio.

U.S. national team appearances
Amateur
Walker Cup: 1951 (winners)

References

American male golfers
USC Trojans men's golfers
Golfers from Cleveland
1920 births
2000 deaths